The Schkopau Power Station is a lignite-fuelled power station near the Korbetha part of the municipality of Schkopau in the district of Merseburg-Querfurt (Saxony-Anhalt), Germany, which was built in 1995/1996. It has two units with a total capacity of 916 megawatts (MW), from which are 110 MW for traction current. It is owned and operated by Uniper and EP Energy. It has additionally a generator for the production of a phase change stream with a frequency of 16.7 cycles per second for Deutsche Bahn AG.

Coal-fired power stations in Germany
Economy of Saxony-Anhalt